UFC 248: Adesanya vs. Romero was a mixed martial arts event produced by the Ultimate Fighting Championship that took place on March 7, 2020 at the T-Mobile Arena in Paradise, Nevada, part of the Las Vegas Metropolitan Area, United States.

Background
A UFC Middleweight Championship bout between the current champion Israel Adesanya and former interim title challenger (as well as 2000 Olympic silver medalist and former world champion in freestyle wrestling) Yoel Romero headlined the event.

A UFC Women's Strawweight Championship bout between the current champion Zhang Weili and former champion Joanna Jędrzejczyk took place as the co-main event.

A middleweight bout between former champion Robert Whittaker (also The Ultimate Fighter: The Smashes welterweight winner) and Jared Cannonier was expected to take place at this event. However, it was announced on January 15 that Whittaker pulled out of the bout. Subsequently, promotion officials announced that Cannonier would be on standby in the event that one of the main event participants were to pull out of that contest. In turn, Cannonier indicated in mid-February that he had suffered a torn pectoral injury while training and would be sidelined for several months.

A bantamweight bout between Sean O'Malley and The Ultimate Fighter: Latin America bantamweight winner José Alberto Quiñónez was originally scheduled to take place at UFC 229. However, it was scrapped after O'Malley failed a United States Anti-Doping Agency (USADA) drug test. The bout was then expected to take place at UFC 247, but it was eventually moved to this event for unknown reasons.

While not officially announced by the organization, a featherweight bout between Calvin Kattar and Jeremy Stephens was expected to take place at the event. However, Stephens was removed from the card in mid-January with an injury. The pairing was left intact and rescheduled for UFC 249.

A featherweight bout between Douglas Silva de Andrade and Movsar Evloev was scheduled to take place at the event. However, de Andrade withdrew from the bout due to injury and was replaced by promotional newcomer Jamall Emmers. Subsequently, Evloev pulled out of the fight in late February citing injuries sustained in a road accident. He was replaced by Giga Chikadze.

A middleweight bout between Derek Brunson and Edmen Shahbazyan was scheduled to take place at the event. However, it was announced on February 20 that the bout had moved to UFC Fight Night: Overeem vs. Harris.

At the weigh-ins, Emily Whitmire weighed in at 117.5 pounds, 1.5 pounds over the strawweight non-title fight limit of 116 pounds. She was fined 20% of her purse and her bout with Polyana Viana was expected to proceed as scheduled at a catchweight. However, Whitmire was hospitalized the day of the event and the fight was cancelled.

Results

Bonus awards
The following fighters received $50,000 bonuses.
Fight of the Night: Zhang Weili vs. Joanna Jędrzejczyk
Performance of the Night: Beneil Dariush and Sean O’Malley

Reported payout
The following is the reported payout to the fighters as reported to the Nevada State Athletic Commission (NSAC). It does not include sponsor money and also does not include the UFC's traditional "fight night" bonuses. The total disclosed payout for the event was $2,086,000.
 Israel Adesanya: $500,000 (no win bonus) def. Yoel Romero: $350,000
 Zhang Weili: $200,000 (includes $100,000 win bonus) def. Joanna Jędrzejczyk: $106,000
 Beneil Dariush: $140,000 (includes $70,000 win bonus) def. Drakkar Klose: $40,000
 Neil Magny: $152,000 (includes $76,000 win bonus) def. Li Jingliang: $64,000
 Alex Oliviera: $128,000 (includes $64,000 win bonus) def. Max Griffin: $35,000
 Sean O'Malley: $70,000 (includes $35,000 win bonus) def. José Alberto Quiñónez: $33,000 
 Mark Madsen: $66,000 (includes $33,000 win bonus) def. Austin Hubbard: $12,000
 Rodolfo Vieira: $28,000 (includes $14,000 win bonus) def. Saparbek Safarov: $22,000 
 Gerald Meerschaert: $60,000 (includes $30,000 win bonus) def. Deron Winn: $12,000
 Giga Chikadze: $24,000 (includes $12,000 win bonus) def. Jamall Emmers: $10,000
 Danaa Batgerel: $20,000 (includes $10,000 win bonus) def. Guido Cannetti: $14,000

Aftermath
On September 3, it was announced that the Nevada State Athletic Commission (NAC) suspended Deron Winn for nine months and fined him fined $1,800 after he tested positive for amphetamines in relation to this event. The suspension is retroactive to the date of the positive test.

See also 

 List of UFC events
 List of current UFC fighters
 2020 in UFC

References 

Ultimate Fighting Championship events
2020 in mixed martial arts
2020 in sports in Nevada
Mixed martial arts in Las Vegas
Sports competitions in the Las Vegas Valley
March 2020 sports events in the United States